Garfield railway station, a regional railway station in Victoria, Australia
 Garfield station (NJ Transit),an NJ Transit station in Garfield, New Jersey, United States.
 Garfield station (CTA Green Line), a Chicago "L" station in Washington Park, Chicago, Illinois, United States
 Garfield station (CTA Red Line), a Chicago "L" station in Fuller Park, Chicago, Illinois, United States
 Garfield Avenue station, a light rail station in Jersey City, New Jersey, United States